Cole Creek may refer to:

 Cole Creek (Hungry Mother Creek), a stream in Missouri
 Cole Creek (Missouri River), a stream in Missouri
 Cole Creek (Prairie Fork), a stream in Missouri
 Cole Creek (Pennsylvania)
 Cole Creek (South Dakota)

See also
Coles Creek (disambiguation)